Tench Francis (? probably in Philadelphia – 16 August 1758) was a prominent lawyer and jurist in colonial Maryland and Philadelphia, Pennsylvania.

Early life
Francis was the son of Rev. John Francis, Dean of Linsmore and Rector of St. Mary's Church in Dublin, Ireland.

Career

Maryland
Sometime before 1720, after studying law in London, he moved to America as an attorney for Lord Baltimore. In Kent County, Maryland, he opened a law office. From 1726 to 1734 he was clerk of Talbot County Court before being elected for a three-year term as legislative representative for Talbot County.

Pennsylvania
He later settled in Philadelphia, where he was attorney-general of Pennsylvania, succeeding Andrew Hamilton, from 1741 to 1755, and recorder of Philadelphia from 1750 to 1755.

He was a founding trustee of the College, Academy, and Charitable Schools of Philadelphia (which became the University of Pennsylvania), and he sent his sons Philip and Turbutt there to study.

Personal life
In 1724 he married Elizabeth Turbutt.  Together, they had:

 Rachel Francis, who married John Retfe
 Turbutt Francis, who married Sarah Mifflin; later their descendants dropped the surname Francis and used the name Mifflin
 Philip Francis, who married Henrietta Maria Goldsborough, who were the grandparents of Philip Francis Thomas
 Ann Francis, who married James Tilghman, who were the parents of Tench Tilghman, who became an aide to George Washington
 Mary Francis, who married William Coxe, who were the parents of Tench Coxe, a delegate from Pennsylvania to the last Continental Congress
 Elizabeth Francis, who married John Lawrence
 Margaret Francis, who married Chief Justice Edward Shippen IV, whose daughter married Benedict Arnold
 Tench Francis Jr., who became a prominent merchant and financier in Philadelphia; married Ann Willing Francis, daughter of Philadelphia mayor Charles Willing and Anne Nancy Shippen (1710–1791) [Anne Nancy [Shippen] Francis was the granddaughter of Philadelphia Mayor Edward Shippen and aunt  to Edward Shippen IV.} Anne [Willing] Francis was also the sister Mary Willing the second wife of William Byrd III

Tench Francis died in Philadelphia in 1758.

References

External links
Portrait at the Metropolitan Museum of Art by Robert Feke

19th-century Irish lawyers
Lawyers from Philadelphia
People of colonial Pennsylvania
People of colonial New Jersey
1758 deaths
Year of birth missing
University of Pennsylvania people
Kingdom of Ireland emigrants to the Thirteen Colonies